Cockhill Celtic Football Club is an Irish association football (soccer) club based in Buncrana, County Donegal. Their senior men's team currently plays in the Ulster Senior League.

History

The club was founded as Westbrook Celtic on 28 October 1970. They originally played in the D&D League, which covered counties Donegal and Derry. They moved to Cockhill and became Cockhill Celtic in 1974, and moved into the Inishowen Football League. They remained there until 2005, when the club transferred to the Ulster Senior League.

In 2017 the club grounds suffered flood damage; they received €101,000 from a UEFA Natural Disaster Grant.

Ground

The club grounds are named after longtime chairman Charlie O'Donnell (chair from 1978 until his death in 2007). They seat 1,000 people and are located on Cockhill in Buncrana. The club also has two astroturf pitches.

Honours
Ulster Senior League
Winners: 2010, 2013, 2014, 2015, 2016, 2016–17, 2017–18, 2018-19, 2019-2020, 2021-2022: 10
Ulster Senior League Cup
Winners: 2010, 2013, 2014, 2015, 2016, 2017, 2018: 7
Inishowen Football League
Winners: 1988–89, 1990–91, 1991–92, 1999–2000, 2004–05: 5
Ulster Junior Cup
Winners: 2003–04: 1

In culture
The club are mentioned in Joseph O'Connor's novel Inishowen (2000).

References

External links
 Official page

1970 establishments in Ireland
Association football clubs established in 1970
Association football clubs in County Donegal
Ulster Senior League (association football) teams
Buncrana